John W. Ligon GT Magnet Middle School, formerly  John W. Ligon Junior-Senior High School, is a public magnet middle school in the Wake County Public School System located in the Chavis Heights neighborhood of Raleigh, North Carolina. It was historically an all black high school in Raleigh until it was integrated in 1971.

History

High school
The groundbreaking ceremony for John W. Ligon High School was held in November 1951. The school opened in 1953, replacing Washington Graded and High School as the only all black secondary education institution in Raleigh, North Carolina. The overall building costs amounted to $1 million, making it the largest school construction project in the state at the time. It was named after John William Ligon, an educator, local pastor and interim principal at Washington. The school's books were supplied secondhand from its white counterpart, Broughton High School. Ligon was seen as model for black education throughout the state, attracting a large number of students and an educated teaching staff from the local black colleges. By the late 1960s it possessed a higher percentage of teachers with graduate degrees than any of Raleigh's three white schools.

Middle school
Ligon served as the city's only black high school until 1971, when it was desegregated and subsequently converted into a junior high school. In the late 1970s, officials considered closing the school, but this was met with opposition from alumni and Ligon continued to operate. In 1982, Ligon was formally consolidated into the new Wake County Public School System and became involved in the Magnet Program. The Crosby-Garfield school in Raleigh merged into Ligon at the same time. Between 1994 and 1995, computers and laserdisc players were installed in many of the school's classrooms. 360 students were educated on the use of ClarisWorks, HyperStudio, and MacGlobe software. Teachers were trained in the areas of data management, email, and multimedia. In the early 2000s, the school underwent major renovations and expansions, including the construction of new hallways, a baseball field, and additional classrooms.

Demographics

After the racial integration period, Ligon heavily promoted diversity, which is still part of its goal. As of 2007, there were 157 Asian students (~15%), 376 African-American students (~36%), 496 White students (~47%), and 17 Hispanic students (~1%). In addition, students' differences in income and class are shown by the 24% of the school which gets reduced price or free lunches.

A large number of its NC state-identified academically gifted students go on to Enloe High School.

Admissions
In the 2008-09 school year, only 34% of applicants received admission.

School awards
2004 Magnet School of Distinction
2005 Magnet School of Excellence
2006 Magnet School of Excellence
2008 Magnet School of Excellence
2008 North Carolina State MATHCOUNTS Champions
2009 North Carolina State MATHCOUNTS Champions
2009 Magnet School of Excellence
2010 North Carolina State MATHCOUNTS Champions
2010 Magnet School of Excellence
2010 Football Conference Champions
2012 Football Conference Champions
2012 Girls' Soccer Conference Champions
2022 Regional Quiz Bowl Champions
2023 Magnet School of Excellence

Chapters
Ligon belongs to multiple school related organizations. Among them are:
Family, Career and Community Leaders of America (FCCLA)
National Junior Honor Society
Tri-M Music Honor Society

Curriculum

Electives
Ligon has many extracurricular courses and electives. These include foreign languages, which include Spanish, German, French, Japanese, Chinese, and American Sign Language. Ligon also offers courses in physical education. These would include, Archery, Tennis 1, Tennis 2, basketball 1, basketball 2, basketball 3, racket sports, sports variety, golf, soccer 1, soccer 2, and fencing.  Ligon also has electives that can be as specific as Flash software and Visual Basic programming. Many electives involve students in running the school, such as technical theater, yearbook, and LTV (Ligon Television).

Unlike most middle schools, who only have ten or so electives, Ligon has about 300 electives. Students can take three electives per quarter, unless they are taking semester-long, or year-long electives.

Performing arts
Ligon offers multiple courses in orchestra, band, dance, chorus, and acting.
Two of Ligon's string orchestras, Silver Strings and Ligon Philharmonic, performed in Carnegie Hall, New York City, NY. Ms. Palma Rajki is the conductor of both orchestras, along with Apprentice Orchestra.
In 2019, the Ligon Jazz Band, directed by Ms. Renee Todd, performed at the Midwest Band and Orchestra Clinic in Chicago, Illinois. They were the 4th school from NC to go to the clinic in it's 74-year history.
Ligon's performing arts have been known to get SUPERIOR ratings at MPA (Music Performing Adjudication) for several years now.

Extracurricular activities

Sports
Ligon's colors are blue and gold, and their teams are referred to as the Little Blues.

Ligon's sports teams include:
Volleyball
Softball
Football
Men's and Women's Soccer
Men's and Women's Basketball
Track and Field
Cheerleading

Clubs
Mock Trial:
In 2022, the Ligon Mock Trial team beat the Moore Square team. It's coached by lawyer Jill Jackson and hosted by social studies teacher Sara Snider.

MATHCOUNTS:
MATHCOUNTS is coached by math teacher Jason Wilson. The team meets on Wednesdays or Thursdays, alternating each week to accommodate students. In 2022, Ligon participated in the Raleigh Chapter competition, but did not make it to State. The team consisted of all sixth graders Harry and Henry Liu, Olufemi Oyejide, and Eli Segal.

Chess Club:
Chess Club is hosted by math teacher Ms. Simms. It meets on the first and third Monday of each month.

Competitions
Shantan Krovvidi went to the National Geography Bee after winning the North Carolina state competition. On 19 May 2009, Krovvidi qualified for the final round. On 20 May 2009, Krovvidi took third place in the final round.

Notable alumni

References

External links
 Ligon Middle School official website
 Magnet Schools of America official website
 NCSU Ligon History Project
 Ligon Staff

African-American history in Raleigh, North Carolina
Wake County Public School System
Public middle schools in North Carolina
Schools in Raleigh, North Carolina
Magnet schools in North Carolina
Historically segregated African-American schools in North Carolina
Former high schools in North Carolina
Educational institutions established in 1953
School buildings completed in 1953
1953 establishments in North Carolina